is a song recorded by Japanese boy band Arashi. It was released on November 11, 2009 through their record label J Storm. "My Girl" was used as the opening theme song for the television drama of the same name which stars Arashi member, Masaki Aiba. "My Girl" was released as a CD single in two formats: a regular edition and a limited edition. The former comes with two B-sides and the instrumental of all the songs, while the latter comes with the B-side  and a DVD.

Background and release
On October 6, 2009, it was announced that Arashi would be singing the opening theme song for the television drama My Girl, which stars member Masaki Aiba. It was released in two formats: a regular and limited edition. Instrumentals for all three tracks were also included. The limited edition included "My Girl" and "Tokei Jikake no Umbrella" and came packaged with a DVD, which contains the promotional video for "My Girl" and the making-of the promotional video. The b-side "Tokei Jikake no Umbrella" was used as the theme song for the mini drama , which stars various talents from Johnny & Associates.

Music video

Jirō writes his name in the space of the biggest room, but Gorō crosses Jirō's name out and puts his name instead. They continue to fight for the room until  (Kazunari Ninomiya) takes the marker from them and writes his name in the space of the smallest room, puzzling the both of them.

While everyone else continues to pack,  (Satoshi Ohno) picks up a picture frame with their mother's photo and carefully puts it into a box. Saburō looks through a photo album and finds a letter from their mother addressed to her sons at the very back, saying that she will be watching over them from the house no matter where they go in the future. He shows the letter to his brothers; Ichirō then takes the floor plan and rips it up.

The scene shifts from a living room full of boxes to a clean living room with everything back in its place. Gorō sends text message to their father, telling him that they will not be moving out of the house in order to stay with their mother. Shirō puts the picture frame of their mother back, and Saburō reattaches the family nameplate, now including the name  next to theirs.

Chart performance
On the issue date of October 26, 2009, the song, "My Girl" debuted on the Billboard Japan Hot 100 chart at number fifty-one. On its fifth week on the chart, the song jumped from number forty-one to number-one during the week of November 28, 2009. On the day of its release the single debuted at number one on the Oricon daily singles chart by selling about 178,000 copies on the first day. On the November 23 issue date, the single debuted atop the Oricon weekly chart selling an estimate of 432,000 copies in its first week, becoming their fourth number-one single of the year. "My Girl" is also the third single of 2009 to open with high sales in its first week, after Arashi's "Ashita no Kioku/Crazy Moon: Kimi wa Muteki" and "Believe/Kumorinochi, Kaisei" respectively.

The single is certified Double Platinum by the Recording Industry Association of Japan (RIAJ) for shipment of 500,000 copies.

Track listing

Charts and certifications

Weekly charts

Year-end charts

Certifications

Release history

References

External links
 "My Girl" product information 

2009 singles
Arashi songs
Billboard Japan Hot 100 number-one singles
Oricon Weekly number-one singles
Japanese television drama theme songs